Trout Creek is a census-designated place (CDP) in Sanders County, Montana, United States. The population was 261 at the 2000 census.  Trout Creek was proclaimed "Huckleberry Capital of Montana" by the state's legislature in 1981.

The post office opened in 1885. In 1910, the townsite was moved downstream to the opposite side of the creek. The town experienced an economic boost with construction of the Noxon Rapids Dam (1955–56).

Geography
Trout Creek is located at  (47.830737, -115.594221).

Climate
This climatic region is typified by large seasonal temperature differences, with warm to hot (and often humid) summers and cold (sometimes extremely cold) winters. According to the Köppen Climate Classification system, Trout Creek has a humid continental climate, abbreviated "Dfb" on climate maps.

Climate

According to the Köppen Climate Classification system, Trout Creek has a warm-summer mediterranean continental climate, abbreviated "Dsb" on climate maps.

Demographics

As of the census of 2000, there were 261 people, 109 households, and 72 families residing in the CDP. The population density was 139.9 people per square mile (54.2/km). There were 135 housing units at an average density of 72.4 per square mile (28.0/km). The racial makeup of the CDP was 93.87% White, 1.92% Native American, and 4.21% from two or more races. Hispanic or Latino of any race were 1.92% of the population.

There were 109 households, out of which 27.5% had children under the age of 18 living with them, 53.2% were married couples living together, 8.3% had a female householder with no husband present, and 33.9% were non-families. 29.4% of all households were made up of individuals, and 7.3% had someone living alone who was 65 years of age or older. The average household size was 2.39 and the average family size was 2.92.

In the CDP, the population was spread out, with 26.1% under the age of 18, 6.5% from 18 to 24, 24.5% from 25 to 44, 32.2% from 45 to 64, and 10.7% who were 65 years of age or older. The median age was 40 years. For every 100 females, there were 117.5 males. For every 100 females age 18 and over, there were 112.1 males.

The median income for a household in the CDP was $26,458, and the median income for a family was $28,958. Males had a median income of $25,357 versus $12,083 for females. The per capita income for the CDP was $15,910. About 17.5% of families and 21.1% of the population were below the poverty line, including 42.5% of those under the age of eighteen and none of those 65 or over.

Popular Events
The second Saturday in February there is an annual Snowmobile Poker Run starting and ending in Trout Creek, MT.

The second week in June there is an annual ATV Rally starting and ending in Trout Creek.  It is typically a two-day event with a short ride the first day.  The second day features a poker run and hog roast or BBQ.

The annual Huckleberry Festival takes place on the second weekend in August.  It is a three-day bazaar with parade, 5K fun run, and live entertainment included.  Many of the booths sell huckleberry based products which local and foreign visitors enjoy (http://huckleberryfestival.com/).

References

Census-designated places in Sanders County, Montana
Census-designated places in Montana